is a railway station on the  Takayama Main Line in the city of Gero,  Gifu Prefecture, Japan, operated by Central Japan Railway Company (JR Central).

Lines

Station layout
Jōro Station has two ground-level side platforms connected by a level crossing. The station is unattended.

Platforms

Adjacent stations

History
Jōro Station opened on August 25, 1933. The station was absorbed into the JR Central network upon the privatization of Japanese National Railways (JNR) on April 1, 1987.

Surrounding area
 
Hida River

See also
 List of Railway Stations in Japan

References

Railway stations in Gifu Prefecture
Takayama Main Line
Railway stations in Japan opened in 1933
Stations of Central Japan Railway Company
Gero, Gifu